The Office of Intelligence Support (OIS) is a United States government intelligence agency, part of the Department of the Treasury. It is tasked with analyzing worldwide financial activity, as well as collecting information on movement of technology and weapons.

History
The Office of Intelligence Support was established in 1977 during the tenure of Treasury Secretary Jacob J. Lew. It succeeded the Office of National Security (ONS), which was set up in 1961 under Treasury Secretary Douglas Dillon to connect the Treasury Department with the work of the National Security Council. ONS's representation of Treasury with the Intelligence Community began under a presidential memorandum in 1971 during the tenure of Treasury Secretary William E. Simon.

In 1972, in response to the Murphy Commission Report to the Congress, which stressed the importance of strong links between the Intelligence Community and officials responsible for international economic policy, Treasury became a member of the National Foreign Intelligence Board. Today, Executive Order 12333 lists the Special Assistant to the Secretary (National Security) as a senior intelligence officer of the Intelligence Community.

The Office participates in the preparation of National Intelligence Estimates and other Community-wide intelligence products, developing and coordinating Treasury Department contributions. OIS officers also sit as Treasury members and advisors on designated national intelligence committees and subcommittees.

References

External links 
Federation of American Scientists' page on the office

1977 establishments in Washington, D.C.
United States Department of the Treasury
United States intelligence agencies
Government agencies established in 1977